Zhur ( or) is a village in the Prizren Municipality in southwestern Kosovo.

History 
After the Kingdom of Serbia acquired Kosovo in the first Balkan War (1912), Serbia arranged a Military Administration named Žur. The municipality was part of the Srez of the Prizren District. This administrative subdivision lasted until January 6, 1929, after which the area was made part of the Vardar Banovina in the newly formed Yugoslavia.

Geography 
Zhur is located in southwestern Kosovo, five kilometers east of Morina in Albania, and eight kilometers west of Prizren. Neighbouring villages include Poslishta and Billusha to the east, as well as Shkoza to the west. The mountain landscape of the Koritnik starts south of the village.

The M-25 goes directly through the village, and the R7 passes north of the village.

Climate

Population 

Zhur has a population of 5,909. Of these, 5,897 are Albanians and six Bosniaks.

Religion 
5,903 are Muslims, one Catholic and one stated otherwise.

Notes

References

External links
 Location

Villages in Prizren